Cylindera viridisticta, the pygmy tiger beetle, is a species of flashy tiger beetle in the family Carabidae. It is found in Central America and North America.

Subspecies
These three subspecies belong to the species Cylindera viridisticta:
 Cylindera viridisticta arizonensis (Bates, 1884)
 Cylindera viridisticta interjecta (W.Horn, 1935)
 Cylindera viridisticta viridisticta (Bates, 1881)

References

Further reading

 

viridisticta
Articles created by Qbugbot
Beetles described in 1881
Beetles of Central America
Beetles of North America